Ekspress-AM4 was a Russian communications satellite placed into the wrong orbit from a faulty Briz-M rocket stage. This satellite was to be part of the Ekspress series of geostationary communications satellites owned by Russian Satellite Communications Company (RSCC). Proposals were made to reposition the satellite to provide broadband services to Antarctica, but ultimately the decision was made to de-orbit the satellite. On 28 March 2012, the satellite splashed into the Pacific Ocean.

Satellite description 
The onboard antennas were capable of broadcasting in the C-band, Ku-band, L-band, and Ka-band. The satellite's orbit was measured at 695 by 20239 km altitude, with an inclination orbit of 51.1°. Though the satellite was placed in the wrong orbit, there was no damage to the satellite, meaning that it became the subject of numerous reuse proposals.

Launch 
The Ekspress-AM4 satellite was launched on 17 August 2011 on a Russian Proton-M launch vehicle from Kazakhstan, which included a Briz-M upper stage. It was just after launch that the Briz-M stage did not separate from the Ekspress satellite, causing it to be placed into the wrong orbit. Contact was lost with the satellite and with its attached Briz M upper stage about six hours after the pair were launched. Telemetry stopped either during or after the fourth of five planned Briz M upper stage burns planned to occur during a nine-hour maneuver designed to insert the satellite into a geosynchronous transfer orbit (GTO).

Reuse proposals 
One of the most notable reuse proposals came from a company called Polar Broadband Systems, which was established in December 2011. Its objectives were to submit proposals for the reuse of semi-retired and retired satellites for use with communications over the Antarctic. The company notes that it would not have been feasible to build a dedicated satellite for the region as the population would not justify the expense, however Ekspress-AM4 would suffice as it could have been maneuvered into the required orbit. There was enough fuel on board for it to be operational for ten years, with giving the Antarctic region 16 hours of broadband access a day. Similarly, Australian company Antarctic Broadband  proposed a similar scheme for Antarctic communications, however neither were successful.

Deorbited 
Dennis Pivnyuk, chief financial officer of the Russian Satellite Communications Company, informed on 15 March 2012 that the satellite would be decommissioned and deorbited. He stated that the descent phase would start on 20 March 2012, with the spacecraft reentering over the Pacific Ocean around 26 March 2012. The spacecraft was destroyed during reentry on 28 March 2012.

References

External links 
 IMS Official provider's site

Ekspress satellites
Satellite launch failures
Spacecraft launched in 2011
Spacecraft which reentered in 2012
2011 in Russia
Satellites using the Eurostar bus
Space accidents and incidents in Kazakhstan